Mitsou (or Mitsou ou Comment l'esprit vient aux filles...) is a 1956 French comedy film directed by Jacqueline Audry and starring Danièle Delorme, Fernand Gravey and François Guérin. A music hall singer becomes involved in a love triangle with an older, wealthy man and a young army officer. It is based on the 1919 novella Mitsou by Colette. The title role is played by Danièle Delorme who had previously appeared as Gigi in the 1949 film adaptation of Colette's work Gigi which was also directed by Audry.

Cast
 Danièle Delorme as Mitsou
 Fernand Gravey as Pierre Duroy-Lelong
 François Guérin as Robert, Le Lieutenant Bleu
 Claude Rich as  Lieutenant Kaki
 Palau as Beauty
 Denise Grey as Estelle
 Jacques Duby as Raphaël

References

External links

1956 films
1950s French-language films
Films based on works by Colette
Films directed by Jacqueline Audry
1956 comedy films
French comedy films
1950s French films